Kateryna Kozlova was the defending champion, having won the event in 2012, but lost in the semifinals to Marta Sirotkina.

Anna-Lena Friedsam won the tournament, defeating Sirotkina in the final, 6–2, 6–3.

Seeds

Main draw

Finals

Top half

Bottom half

References 
 Main draw

Tatarstan Open - Singles
Tatarstan Open
Tatarstan Open - Singles